Mzonke Poni is an activist in Cape Town. He is the former chairperson of Abahlali baseMjondolo of the Western Cape and was previously a leader of the Western Cape Anti-Eviction Campaign. The Sunday Times has described him as "the face of an ANC nightmare - an angry activist mobilising the township masses to protest at what he calls the government's failure to create a better life for the poor."

Poni lives in the QQ Section Informal Settlement in Khayelitsha.

Arrest in June 2009

On 1 June 2009 he was arrested on the site of the Macassar Village Land Occupation and charged with public violence. Abahlali baseMjondolo claimed that the arrest was an act of political intimidation and that Poni was assaulted while in police custody. On 29 September 2009 all charges against Poni were dropped. He represented himself in his trial.

Call for a Week of Informal Settlement's Strike in October 2010

In October 2010 Abahlali baseMjondolo in Cape Town called for a month of direct action. Poni publicly endorsed road blockades a legitimate tactic during this month of action. The Treatment Action Campaign and the South African Communist Party, both of which are affiliated to the ruling African National Congress, issued strong statements condemning the campaign with the former labelling it 'violent' and the latter labelling it 'anarchist' and reactionary'. Abahlali baseMjondolo responded by saying that their support for road blockades roads was not support for violence and that "We have never called for violence. Violence is harm to human beings. Blockading a road is not violence." They also said that in their view the attack from the SACP was really due to the movement's insistence on organising autonomously from the African National Congress.

See also
Western Cape Anti-Eviction Campaign
Abahlali baseMjondolo

References

External links
Khayelitsha Struggles

Works
Public Violence (26 September 2009)
Another World is Possible: Reflections and Criticisms in World Social Forum, 2009, in Belem, Brazil (9 April 2009)
The Big Threat to Informal Settlements (28 November 2009)
Upgrading of Informal Settlements (Don't destroy it upgrade it) (13 October 2008)

South African activists
Shack dwellers
21st-century squatters
Squatter leaders
Abahlali baseMjondolo members
South African communists
Living people
Housing in South Africa
Year of birth missing (living people)